90ML may refer to:
 90 ML (2019 Tamil film), an Indian Tamil-language film
 90ML (2019 Telugu film), an Indian Telugu-language film